The General Congregation is an assembly of the Jesuit representatives from all parts of the world, and serves as the highest authority in the Society of Jesus. A General Congregation (GC) is always summoned on the death or resignation of the administrative head of the order, called the Superior General or Father General, to choose his successor, and it may be called at other times if circumstances warrant. A smaller congregation of worldwide representatives meets every three years to discuss internal business and to decide the need for a general congregation.

Congregations 
Through its four-century history, the Society has convened 36 general congregations.

First General Congregation
The first General Congregation took place in 1558, when Father Diego Laynez was elected Superior General. It had been delayed for two years after St. Ignatius’ death because of a war between King Philip II of Spain and Pope Paul IV.

General Congregation 5
General Congregation 5 took place in 1593-4.

General Congregation 27
General Congregation 27 took place in 1923.

General Congregation 31
General Congregation 31 met during 1965 and 1966, meeting initially for several months, from 7 May to 17 July 1965, then breaking off for over a year and then reconvening for two more months from 8 September to 17 November 1966. GC31 issued 56 decrees and elected Pedro Arrupe as the 28th Superior General.

General Congregation 32 
General Congregation 32 was held between 1974–75. In particular, Decrees 2 and 4 of the congregation highlighted a Jesuit commitment to "the crucial struggle of our time: the struggle for faith and that struggle for justice which it includes".

General Congregation 33
General Congregation 33 in 1983 elected Peter Hans Kolvenbach as Superior General. It reaffirmed the commitment of the previous congregation to the promotion of justice as an integral part of all its ministries in the service of faith, and extended this commitment to refugee populations. In this it was following up on Superior General Pedro Arrupe's founding of the Jesuit Refugee Service in 1980. It also emphasized the importance of inculturation of the church in non-Western cultures, in part due to the large number of delegates coming from various parts of Africa and Asia with, unlike previous congregations, eighteen of the twenty-one delegates from India being native Indians.

General Congregation 34
General Congregation 34 took place in 1995. For the first time in Jesuit history, the majority of delegates did not come from Europe and the United States. It endorsed a justice-based mission mindful of the needs of the poor and marginal. It called for understanding differing cultures on their own terms and openness to other religious traditions. As religious vocations had continued to decline, there was an emphasis on enabling others to serve, with specific emphasis on the laity and on women.

General Congregation 35
General Congregation 35 took place in Rome between 7 January and 6 March 2008. Adolfo Nicolás was elected as the new Father General. Pope Benedict XVI confirmed and applauded the Society's efforts to venture into the "new frontiers" of our time, which included globalization, new technologies, and environmental concerns, even as the previous themes of promotion of justice and care for refugees are reiterated, along with the need to pass on to the laity the Jesuit charism through the Spiritual Exercises and the practice of communal discernment.

General Congregation 36 
General Congregation 36 was called in 2016 after Adolfo Nicolás had announced his resignation, and it elected Arturo Sosa as Superior General to replace him. Taking its cue from Pope Francis' encyclical Laudato si', it emphasized that poverty, social exclusion, and marginalization are linked with environmental degradation. In the second of its two decrees it called for greater commitment to discernment, collaboration, and networking, for a broader process for evaluating the Society's current apostolic preferences which included lay colleagues in the discernment.

References

External links 
  General Congregation 36

Society of Jesus